Brooks Glacier is a glacier in Denali National Park and Preserve in the U.S. state of Alaska. The glacier originates on the east face of Mount Silverthrone at Brooks Gap. The  glacier moves northeast, joining Muldrow Glacier between Mount Brooks and Ragged Peak. Brooks Glacier was named by T.G. Gerdine of the U.S. Geological Survey circa 1900 for geologist Alfred Hulse Brooks.

See also
 List of glaciers

Cited references

Glaciers of Denali Borough, Alaska
Glaciers of Denali National Park and Preserve
Glaciers of Alaska